The Trumpet Summit Meets the Oscar Peterson Big 4 is a 1980 album featuring the trumpeters Dizzy Gillespie, Clark Terry, and Freddie Hubbard, supported by a quartet led by Oscar Peterson. Outtakes from the 1980 session that produced this album were released as The Alternate Blues.

Track listing 
 "Daahoud" (Clifford Brown) – 8:38
 "Chicken Wings" (Ray Brown, Bobby Durham, Freddie Hubbard, Joe Pass, Oscar Peterson, Clark Terry) – 9:35
 "Just Friends" (John Klenner, Sam M. Lewis) – 11:58
 "The Champ" (Dizzy Gillespie) – 7:55

Personnel

Performance 
 Oscar Peterson – piano
 Clark Terry – trumpet
 Dizzy Gillespie – trumpet
 Freddie Hubbard – trumpet
 Joe Pass – guitar
 Ray Brown – bass
 Bobby Durham – drums

References 

1980 albums
Oscar Peterson albums
Freddie Hubbard albums
Clark Terry albums
Dizzy Gillespie albums
Albums produced by Norman Granz
Pablo Records albums